Vatterott College was a for-profit career training institute with programs at 16 campuses across the Midwest of the United States and online. It was operated by Vatterott Educational Centers, Inc., and owned by the private equity firm TA Associates. The college also offered distance-learning programs, called  Courses, which allowed students to earn credits, diplomas, and degrees through online classes. These resources were also available to distance education students and on-campus students.

History
Vatterott College was found in 1969 in St. Louis, Missouri by John C. Vatterott Sr. The original name was Urban Technical Centers, Inc., and subsequent changes included Vatterott & Sullivan Educational Center and Vatterott Educational Centers.

The institution changed its name to Vatterott College in 1989 when associate degree (specialized) granting authority was issued by the Accrediting Commission of National Association of Trade and Technical Schools (NATTS), which was called the Accrediting Commission of Career Schools and Colleges (ACCSC).

In January 1985, the institution opened a facility in St. Ann, Missouri.

The college expanded to Springfield, Joplin,  Independence, and Missouri in April 1991 as a result of a teach-out of students attending Draughon Business College. In August 1991, Vatterott College was authorized to establish branch campuses at these locations. In May 1995, Vatterott College expanded to Quincy, Illinois, as a result of the acquisition of the former Quincy Technical Schools.

In June 1996, the Business and Banking Institutes with locations in Omaha, Nebraska, Des Moines, and Iowa were acquired. Programs were added and the institutions were relocated under the Vatterott brand. In the same year, an additional location of the St. Ann campus opened in Sunset Hills, Missouri. Vatterott College expanded into the following cities as a result of various teach-out agreements: St. Joseph, Missouri, in March 1995; Tulsa, Oklahoma, in 1997; Memphis, Tennessee, in 1999; Wichita, Kansas, in 1999; and Cleveland, Ohio in 2001. In 1997, a location was opened in Oklahoma City, Oklahoma.

In December 1999, Vatterott College expanded in Omaha, Nebraska by acquiring the former Universal Technology Institute. In January 2000, a campus was established in O’Fallon, Missouri. In September 2001, Vatterott College purchased the former Omaha College of Health Careers in Omaha, Nebraska, and established a campus.

Wellspring Capital Management purchased all Vatterott College locations in January 2003 and named the holding company as Vatterott Educational Centers, Inc.

L’Ecole Culinaire, a culinary school located in St. Louis, was opened in 2004. Vatterott College operations expanded into Texas in 2004, acquiring the Court Reporting Institute of Dallas and the Court Reporting Institute of Houston. These two campuses were permanently closed in 2015.

In January 2007, Vatterott Education Center located in Dallas, Texas was approved as a branch campus of the Quincy main institution and has been closed since 2014. The Vatterott Career College, Appling Farms (Memphis, TN) location was opened in April 2008. In November 2008, L’École Culinaire, Cordova, Tennessee, was opened. Vatterott College was established in Fairview Heights, Illinois in August 2009 with seven diploma programs.

In September 2009, TA Associates acquired Vatterott Educational Centers, Inc. from WellSpring Capital Partners. 
The O’Fallon, Missouri, location relocated in the fall of 2010 to a renovated building in St. Charles, Missouri. The Court Reporting Institute opened a campus in Arlington, Virginia, in December 2011 and was closed within one year after opening.

"ex’Treme Institute by Nelly", a music recording and production school, was opened in St. Louis, Missouri in December 2011.

In 2017, forty programs at Vatterott failed the first test of the Obama Administration's gainful employment rule. The following year, in November 2018, the Quincy, Des Moines, Wichita, Cleveland, and Oklahoma City campuses were permanently closed.  One month later the college lost its accreditation by the Accrediting Commission of Career Schools and Colleges.

Lawsuits, investigations, and criticism

In 2009, three executives of the Vatterott were convicted of conspiring to obtain federal student grants and loans for students who were not eligible by providing false information and documents.

In 2014, the college was sued by a student who claimed that she was misled that her credits from the college would be transferable toward a nursing certificate. The plaintiff was awarded $27,676 in actual damages and about $2 million in punitive damages because the state of Missouri law caps these awards.

In January 2017, Brian Carroll, president of the college's Kansas City campus for the previous five years, was fired by the school because he allowed a homeless student to sleep in the library on a night where temperatures fell to -4 degrees Fahrenheit.

Effective December 17, 2018, Vatterott College has closed its remaining campus.

, Vatterott still owes the US Department of Education $244 million.

Locations
Vatterott College closed all campuses on December 17, 2018.

References

External links 
 Vatterott College
 L'Ecole Culinaire

Career and technical education
Defunct private universities and colleges in Iowa
Defunct private universities and colleges in Kansas
Defunct private universities and colleges in Missouri
Defunct private universities and colleges in Nebraska
Defunct private universities and colleges in Ohio
Defunct private universities and colleges in Oklahoma
Defunct private universities and colleges in Tennessee
Defunct private universities and colleges in Texas
Education in Adams County, Illinois
Education in St. Clair County, Illinois
Education in Des Moines, Iowa
Education in Wichita, Kansas
Education in Jasper County, Missouri
Education in Kansas City, Missouri
Education in Springfield, Missouri
Education in Buchanan County, Missouri
Education in Omaha, Nebraska
Education in Cleveland
Defunct universities and colleges in Tulsa, Oklahoma
Education in Oklahoma City
Education in Memphis, Tennessee
Education in Dallas
Education in Houston
Universities and colleges in St. Louis County, Missouri
Universities and colleges in St. Louis
Former for-profit universities and colleges in the United States
Educational institutions disestablished in 2018
Defunct private universities and colleges in Illinois
Educational institutions established in 1969